Ujjal Narayan Sinha was the Chief Justice of Patna High Court from 5 September 1970 to 29 September 1972. He was also the acting Governor of Bihar from 21 January to 31 January 1971.

Sinha was commissioned to produce a report into the 1975 Chasnala mining disaster, the worst mining accident in Indian history. The report was submitted on 24 March 1977.

References

Governors of Bihar
Indian judges
Chief Justices of the Patna High Court
Living people
Year of birth missing (living people)